Lord Strathcona's Horse (Royal Canadians) (LdSH[RC]) is a regular armoured regiment of the Canadian Army and is Canada’s only tank regiment. Currently based in Edmonton, Alberta, the regiment is part of 3rd Canadian Division's 1 Canadian Mechanized Brigade Group. Members of the regiment are commonly called Strathconas or Strats as a short form. It was one of the last regiments in the British Empire to be created and raised by a private individual, Donald Alexander Smith, 1st Baron Strathcona and Mount Royal.

The regimental motto is "Perseverance". The colonel-in-chief of the regiment is King Charles III, while the colonel of the regiment is Brigadier-General (Retired) Craig Hilton. The current commanding officer is Lieutenant-Colonel M.J.D. Mallette, and the regimental sergeant major is Chief Warrant Officer R. Englehart.

Regimental structure 
The regiment is currently composed of a regimental headquarters and three sabre squadrons: two tank squadrons (A and B), and a light cavalry squadron, in addition to a headquarters squadron which provides service support. In September 2006, B Squadron deployed to Afghanistan using the Leopard C2, the first NATO deployment of main battle tanks (MBTs) to Afghanistan.

Each year the squadron that distinguishes itself with the highest efficiency rating in the regiment earns the title "Prince of Wales Squadron" for the year.  The regiment has seven affiliated cadet corps in Alberta and British Columbia.

Role 
Lord Strathcona's Horse operates with 40 Leopard 2's (20 A4's, 9 A4M's and 11 2A6M's) and 12 Coyote Reconnaissance Vehicles. Due to a change in Canadian army doctrine in the early 2000s away from heavy armour to more infantry-centred operations, Lord Strathcona's Horse was for several years the only regular armoured regiment to operate MBTs. This was until the 2006 announcement that the Royal Canadian Dragoons would be re-equipped with a squadron of Leopards.

Heraldry

Badge

Description 
 Armorial Description: Lord Strathcona's Coat of Arms, without supporters, being a shield surmounted by a maple tree inclined to the left, and cut through by a beaver working at the base; in the chief a demi-lion rampant; in the centre a railroad spike and hammer crossed; in the base a canoe bearing a flag inscribed NW and containing four men; the whole surrounded by a riband which is encircled by a wreath of roses, thistles, shamrocks and maple leaves, and inscribed LORD STRATHCONA'S HORSE, ROYAL CANADIANS, surmounted by a scroll bearing the motto PERSEVERANCE, and the whole surmounted by the Crown.

Symbolism 
This badge commemorates Lord Strathcona's role in the fur trade and in the settlement of North West Canada (as the province of Alberta was called prior to 1905) by its representation of a Hudson's Bay Company trade canoe, the flag 'NW' (for "North West"), and the representation of the railway construction tools.  The latter mark Lord Strathcona's direct role in the construction of the Canadian Pacific Railway.

Shoulder title 
 STRATHCONA'S (brass DEU); LdSH(RC) (CADPAT)

Lineage

Originated 1 July 1901 in Winnipeg, Manitoba, as an independent Permanent Active Militia corps of mounted rifles, designated as A Squadron, The Canadian Mounted Rifles
Redesignated 1 October 1903 as The Royal Canadian Mounted Rifles
Redesignated 1 October 1909 as Strathcona's Horse (Royal Canadians)
Redesignated 1 May 1911 as Lord Strathcona's Horse (Royal Canadians)
Redesignated 16 October 1946 as the 2nd Armoured Regiment (Lord Strathcona's Horse (Royal Canadians)), RCAC
Redesignated 2 March 1949 as Lord Strathcona's Horse (Royal Canadians) (2nd Armoured Regiment)
Redesignated 19 May 1958 as Lord Strathcona's Horse (Royal Canadians)

Lineage Chart 
The lineage of Lord Strathcona's Horse (Royal Canadians).

Perpetuation

South Africa
Strathcona's Horse of 1900–1901

Operational history

South African War
Strathcona's Horse was authorized on 1 February 1900 and embarked for Africa on 17 March 1900. There it fought as part of the 3rd Mounted Brigade and 4th Infantry Brigade, II Division, until its departure from the theatre of operations on 20 January 1901. The unit disbanded on 9 March 1901.

The First World War
The regiment was placed on active service at the start of the Great War on 6 August 1914 for instructional and camp administration duties. On 14 September 1914 the regiment mobilized Lord Strathcona's Horse (Royal Canadians), CEF, which embarked for England on 3 October 1914. On 5 May 1915 it disembarked in France, where it fought dismounted in an infantry role with Seeley's Detachment (really the Canadian Cavalry Brigade, part of the 2nd Indian Cavalry Division), 1st Canadian Division. On 27 January 1916, the regiment remounted and resumed its cavalry role as part of the 1st Canadian Cavalry Brigade, with whom it continued to fight in France and Flanders until the end of the war. The overseas regiment disbanded on 6 November 1920.

The Second World War 
On 24 May 1940, Regimental Headquarters and one squadron were mobilized together with the Regimental Headquarters and one squadron of The Royal Canadian Dragoons to form the 1st Canadian Motorcycle Regiment, CASF (RCD/LSH(RC)). It was redesignated as Lord Strathcona's Horse (Royal Canadians), CASF, on 21 September 1940; as the 2nd Armoured Regiment (Lord Strathcona's Horse (Royal Canadians)), CASF, on 11 February 1941; as the 2nd Armoured Regiment (Lord Strathcona's Horse (Royal Canadians)), CAC, CASF, on 15 October 1943; and as the 2nd Armoured Regiment (Lord Strathcona's Horse (Royal Canadians)), RCAC, CASF, on 2 August 1945. The regiment embarked for Britain on 13 November 1941 and landed in Italy on 8 November 1943, where it fought as part of the 5th Armoured Brigade, 5th Canadian Armoured Division. On 16 February 1945 the regiment moved with the I Canadian Corps to North-West Europe as part of Operation Goldflake, where it fought until the end of the war. The overseas regiment was disbanded on 1 March 1946.

On 1 September 1945 a second Active Force component of the regiment was mobilized for service in the Pacific theatre of operations designated as the 2nd–2nd Armoured Car Regiment (Lord Strathcona's Horse (Royal Canadians)), RCAC, CASF. It was redesignated as the 2nd Armoured Regiment (Lord Strathcona's Horse (Royal Canadians)), RCAC, CASF) on 1 March 1946 and on 27 June 1946 it was embodied in the Permanent Force.

Korea, the UN and NATO
A, B and C Squadrons fought independently in Korea from 19 April 1951 to 27 July 1953 as part of the 25th Canadian Infantry Brigade Group, 1st Commonwealth Division. The squadrons were equipped with M4A3E8 Sherman tanks.

Lord Strathcona's Horse (Royal Canadians), along with The Royal Canadian Dragoons, contributed troops to 56 Recce Squadron for duty with the United Nations Emergency Force (UNEF) from March 1957 to January 1959, equipped with Ferret armoured cars. The Battle Captain, Capt Norman A. Shackleton, the 1st Troop Leader, Lt. CC Van Straubenzee, and the 3rd Troop Leader, Lt. F.G. Woodrow, as well as half of the NCOs and soldiers were Strathcona's. Two members of 56 Recce Squadron died: Lt. Charles C. Van Straubenzee on 10 May 1957 and Tpr. George E. McDavid on 29 Nov 1957. Other squadrons of the regiment served there and in Cyprus. Tpr. Reginald J. Wiley died on UN duty in the Sinai on 7 September 1961. The Strathcona's last deployment to Cyprus took place from August 1988 to March 1989.

The regiment served two tours of duty in Germany as part of Canada's contribution to NATO, equipped with Centurion tanks.

During the 1990s, the regiment deployed to the Former Republic of Yugoslavia twice as part of the United Nations Protection Force (UNPROFOR) and once as part of NATO's Stabilization Force (SFOR), largely equipped with the AVGP Cougar armoured car.

Afghanistan
The Strathcona's contributed several tank squadrons as well as reconnaissance personnel to the various Canadian task forces that served in Afghanistan from 2002 to 2014. Tpr Michael Yuki Hayakaze was killed in action in Afghanistan on 2 March 2008.

History

Strathcona's Horse and The Boer War 
The regiment was one of the last in the British Empire to be created and raised by a private individual, Donald Alexander Smith, 1st Baron Strathcona and Mount Royal. During the Boer War, Lord Strathcona recruited and equipped the cavalry regiment at his own expense for service in South Africa. Many skilled horsemen (cowboys and North-West Mounted Police members) enlisted, allowing for a short training period and rapid deployment to Africa. The 537 officers and men, as well as 599 horses, of the new regiment sailed from Halifax on 18 March 1900 and arrived in Cape Town on 10 April. Along with The Royal Canadian Dragoons, the regiment won renown for their scouting skills.Rumour exists that members of the North-West Mounted Police serving with the regiment during the Boer War preferred the boots the regiment wore, and adopted them as their own – hence the name "Strathcona boots" for Royal Canadian Mounted Police high brown boots.

Another legacy of the official kit is the huge popularity of the distinctive Stetson Campaign Hat worn by all Canadians serving in Africa during the Second Boer War.  After seeing Canadian troops in this attire at the Relief of Mafeking, British Officer Robert Baden-Powell ordered 10,000 of the hats for his own troops.

Supposedly General Kitchener was astonished at the size of the newly arrived Canadian soldiers. Their commander, Sam Steele, is said to have replied "My apologies, sir. I combed all of Canada and these are the smallest I could find."

Early 1900s 
After the war, the regiment boarded ship at Cape Town on 20 January 1901 and arrived in London on 14 February. Here they met Lord Strathcona for the first time and were presented their medals by King Edward VII personally. On its return to Canada on 9 March 1901, the regiment was disbanded. The name "Strathcona's Horse" was revived in 1909 when the Royal Canadian Mounted Rifles (which had been created in the Permanent Force in 1901) was renamed "Strathcona's Horse (Royal Canadians)". The word Lord was prepended to the regimental title in 1911.

First World War 
At the outbreak of the First World War, the regiment was mobilised and began its training in England. In 1915, Lord Strathcona's Horse served as infantry in the trenches in France. On 16 February 1916, the Strathcona's were reconstituted as a mounted force and, as an Imperial Service Regiment, served in the Canadian Cavalry Brigade attached to the 2nd Indian Cavalry Division, which in November 1916 became the 5th Cavalry Division of the British 4th Army. In March 1917, the regiment saw action as cavalry during the defence of the Somme front. It was during this fighting that Lieutenant Frederick Harvey won the Victoria Cross for rushing a German machine gun post and capturing the gun position. In spring 1918 during the last great German offensive, called by the Germans Operation Michael, when the Imperial and French armies were on the verge of being split, the regiment earned its third Victoria Cross.

On 31 March 1918, in what is known as "the last great cavalry charge" at the Battle of Moreuil Wood, Lieutenant Gordon Flowerdew was posthumously awarded the Victoria Cross for leading the charge in a successful engagement with entrenched German forces.  Nearly three-quarters of the Canadian cavalry involved in the attack against German machine-gun positions were killed or wounded. Unable to break the trench deadlock and of little use at the front, cavalry remained behind the lines for much of the war. During the German offensives of March and April 1918, however, the cavalry played an essential role in the open warfare that temporarily confronted the retreating British forces.

Second World War 
During the Second World War, the regiment mobilised an armoured regiment for overseas service, which joined the First Canadian Armoured Division (renamed the 5th Canadian Armoured Division). During an inspection in England, King George VI noticed that the divisional patches on the sleeves of the troopers bore the legend "LSH". He remarked to a Strathcona's officer that he had always thought the proper abbreviation of "Lord" was "Ld". The regiment promptly changed its formation patches and have used the correct designation ever since.

One of the many dramatic changes World War I introduced into military organisation and technology was the introduction of the tank, however, Canada would persist with horse cavalry until the Summer of 1940. The regiment did have a Ford and a Chevrolet armoured car, representing 50% of Canada's entire armoured strength at the start of the Second World War. In July 1940, LdSH(RC) along with The Royal Canadian Dragoons, were mobilized as the 1st Canadian Motorcycle Regiment. Later that year, the Strathcona's became 2nd Armoured Regiment, Lord Strathcona's Horse (Royal Canadians). The Regiment trained in England for two years with Canadian built Ram tanks and saw its first action in an armoured role in Italy.

One of the regiment's most noteworthy battles in Italy was the Melfa River Crossing. During this desperate battle the Strathcona RHQ reconnaissance troop established a bridgehead in conjunction with "A" Company, The Westminster Regiment (Motor) on the Melfa River and held it against determined German tank and infantry attacks until reinforcements could arrive. The action resulted in a Victoria Cross being awarded to the OC "A" Company, Major Jack Mahony and forged a long-standing association between the two regiments.

The advance up the boot of Italy bloodied the regiment but also forged their identity as a Canadian tank unit, second to none. The regiment left Italy in February 1945, and fought in the North West Europe campaign to liberate the Netherlands and the Lowlands. In 1946, the regiment returned to Canada and except for two operational tours in Germany, called Calgary its home garrison.

Post War to The Present 
During the Cold War, the regiment was deployed on several rotations to West Germany, and three squadrons fought in rotation in the Korean War as part of the 1st Commonwealth Division. Originally intended to be equipped with M-10 tank destroyers, the Strathconas in Korea went into action with M4A3E8 Sherman tanks.

Other deployments include two six-month missions in Bosnia: 1994 with the United Nations and 1997 with NATO. In 2002 the Reconnaissance Squadron participated as part of the Canadian battle group during the U.S.-led invasion of Afghanistan. The squadron returned to Kabul, Afghanistan for a six-month rotation in 2004 as part of Canada's ongoing commitment to the International Security Assistance Force. Since September 2006, various squadrons of Lord Strathcona's Horse (Royal Canadians) have served continuously in Afghanistan, forming the basis of every tank squadron to serve as part of Task Force Kandahar.

In 2000, to commemorate the centenary of its original foundation, a mounted detachment of eighteen members from Lord Strathcona's Horse (Royal Canadians) was invited to London, where, in ceremonial full-dress, they mounted the Queen's Life Guard at the Horse Guards on seven days between 8 and 23 September.  This was a very great honour, as they were the first overseas unit ever to have mounted the Queen's Life Guard at the Horse Guards.

Freedom of the city was exercised by Lord Strathcona's Horse (Royal Canadians) in St. Albert, Alberta, on June 11, 2011.  This was followed by the Freedom of the City being offered by Strathcona County in Sherwood Park, Alberta on August 24, 2013.

Alliances 
: The Royal Lancers (Queen Elizabeths' Own)
: 10th Armoured Cavalry Brigade (Bond of Friendship)

Uniform

Full dress uniform (No. 1 dress) 
 scarlet: facings: myrtle green; headdress: dragoon helmet with red and white plume; tartan: ? (pipers' trews, later kilts)

Service dress (No. 3 dress) 
 Canadian Army pattern service dress, with collar badges (or "dogs") of the Strathcona Coat of Arms.

Battle honours
In the list below, battle honours in capitals were awarded for participation in large operations and campaigns, while those in lowercase indicate honours granted for more specific battles. Those battle honours in bold type are emblazoned on the regimental guidon.

South African War

Great War

Second World War

Korea

Afghanistan

Victoria Crosses
Lieutenant Gordon Muriel Flowerdew, VC
Lieutenant Frederick Maurice Watson Harvey, VC, CBE, MC, Croix de Guerre
Sergeant Arthur Herbert Lindsay Richardson, VC

Ceremonial units

Mounted Troop
The Strathcona Ceremonial Mounted Troop is the mounted ceremonial cavalry unit of the regiment. It is currently the last surviving military mounted troop in the country.

Pipes and Drums

Lord Strathcona's Horse is one of the few non-Canadian-Scottish regiments to maintain a pipe band. Although the 2nd Battalion, The Royal Canadian Regiment (2RCR), maintains the only pipes and drums in the regular army, Lord Strathcona's Horse also maintains its own pipes and drums. The difference between the two is that the 2RCR Pipes and Drums is funded directly by the Battalion, while the LdSH (RC) pipes and drums is funded by the regimental society. As such, the Strathcona Pipes and Drums is a voluntary band that consists of both members of the regiment and outside volunteers, all of whom serve in the authorized pipe band of the regiment. The pipes and drums was created in 1980 through the advocacy of Warrant Officer P. Peters, who acted as the unofficial regimental piper. In 1998, when the official Land Force Western Area Band was dissolved, Peters immediately formed a pipe band consisting of seven Strathconas to perform at regimental functions. Its first official appearance was at the Californian home of former Prime Minister of Canada Kim Campbell.

Since then, the pipe band has taken part in regimental events such as military parades and provincial state funerals in Edmonton. In 2000, major international events such as the 100th birthday of Queen Elizabeth The Queen Mother saw the band travel to South Africa, the Netherlands, and the United Kingdom. A year later, it performed at the celebrations Golden Jubilee of Elizabeth II in the U.K. In 2008, the operational activities of the regiment in Afghanistan resulted in a decision to cease all activities, an arrangement that lasted until it was reconstituted in 2011.

The following served as drum majors for the band:

Warrant Officer Brian Talty (1999–2002)
Warrant Officer K. Hepburn (2002–2004) 
Warrant Officer R. Stacey (2004–2005) 
Warrant Officer J. Hapgood (2005–2007) 
Warrant Officer A. Batty (2007–2008) 
Disbanded due to operational commitment (2008–2011)

The following served as pipe majors for the band:

Warrant Officer Paul Peters (1998–2001)
Master Corporal Al MacNeill (2001–2002)
Master Corporal Marvin MacNeill (2002–2008)
Warrant Officer Marvin MacNeill (2011–2013)
Warrant Officer Conway Boland (2013–present)

Despite the cavalry traditions of the regiment, the pipes and drums does not perform in full dress uniform due to concerns of a confusion with the Strathcona Mounted Troop. In light of this, the regiment authorized a hybrid uniform custom designed for the band. The band uniform consists of a midnight blue patrol jacket, kilts (in the pattern if the official MacKenzie tartan) and a sporran that is similar to that of the Pipes and Drums of the Royal Tank Regiment.

Predecessors 
One of the predecessors of the pipe band was the regimental brass and reed military band consisting of approximately 50 to 70 professional musicians during its 12-year existence from 1956 to 1968. The band was one of seventeen joint-service bands to take part in the 1967 Canadian Armed Forces Tattoo celebrating the Canadian Centennial of that year. Allan Rae, a Canadian composer who was known most notably for being a former board member of the Canadian League of Composers, was a member of the band in the 70s. Derek Stannard, who later became the director of the Central Band of the Canadian Armed Forces, also was a member of this band. In the wake of its disbandment, a voluntary drum and bugle corps was established by Warrant Officer Mucker Langan in 1971, whose volunteers primary duties were with the regiment's Assault Troop. Both of these bands performed in the regimental full dress uniform, all of which were transferred to the Ceremonial Mounted Troop in 1974.

Regimental Museum and Archives
The Regimental Museum and Archives are at The Military Museums in Calgary, Alberta. The museum has a static gallery of  that tells the history of the regiment from 1900 to present, with a rotating selection of special exhibits and displays. The regimental collection holds thousands of artifacts and relics, while the archives has photographs, records, documents and diaries with which it conducts research for personal and professional institutions around the world. The museum is staffed by two full-time Regular Force soldiers, a captain and sergeant, with additional volunteers assisting in research, outreach and design.

On average, the museum hosts approximately 40,000 visitors annually and educates the public with stories of cavalry history and traditions from Western Canada's only Regular Force armoured unit. The LdSH(RC) Museum and Archives are mandated to assist the public-at-large with research on their family connections to the regiment as well as to perform educational outreach to the regiment, its members and the city of Calgary. Participating in displays at Spruce Meadows, Canada Day and the Calgary Stampede, members from the LdSH(RC) Museum are familiar sight around Calgary and they aim to educate, train and inform the public about the history of the regiment.

Cadets
There are several Royal Canadian Army Cadets units spread across Alberta, British Columbia and the Northwest Territories which are affiliated to the Lord Strachcona's Horse (Royal Canadians). Cadets are not soldiers; they are part of an organization dedicated to developing citizenship and leadership among young men and women aged 12 to 18 years of age with a military flavour, and are not required to join the Canadian Forces.

Cadet units affiliated to the LdSH(RC) receive support and also are entitled to wear traditional regimental accoutrements on their uniforms.

Order of precedence

See also

 List of regiments of cavalry of the Canadian Militia (1900–1920)
 List of mounted regiments in the Canadian Expeditionary Force
 The Canadian Crown and the Canadian Forces
 Horses in World War I

Media
Lord Strathcona's Horse (Royal Canadians) : A Pictorial History by Ian D. Barnes; Henry, Sean A.; Snell, Mike J. (2005)
 Lord Strathcona's Horse (Royal Canadians) A Record of Achievement by Lieutenant-Colonel J. M. McAvity (Jan 1 1947)
The story of a regiment: Lord Strathcona's Horse (Royal Canadians) (Strathcona historical series) 
Strathcona's Horse : South Africa, 1900–1901 by Lord Strathcona's Horse (Royal Canadians) Regimental Society (1971)
Stand to Your Horses - Through the First World War 1914–1918 with Lord Strathcona's Horse (Royal Canadians) by Captain S. H. Williams, MC (1961)

References

External links

Lord Strathcona's Horse (Royal Canadians) Canadian Forces page
Lord Strathcona's Horse (Royal Canadians) Regimental Society
Lord Strathcona's Horse (Royal Canadians) Regimental Manual, Third Edition, 2015

Lord Strathcona's Horse (Royal Canadians)
Military units and formations established in 1901
Military units and formations of the Second Boer War
Armoured regiments of Canada
Cavalry regiments of Canada
Organizations based in Edmonton
Military units and formations of Alberta
Military units and formations of Manitoba
Regiments of Canada in World War II
Canadian Militia
Mounted Regiments of the Canadian Expeditionary Force